This is a list of Brazilian television related events from 1980.

Events

 July 18th - Rede Tupi closes.

Debuts

Television shows

1970s
Turma da Mônica (1976–present)
Sítio do Picapau Amarelo (1977–1986)

Births
21 April - Sidney Sampaio, actor
22 April
Rodrigo Hilbert, actor & model
Elaine Mickely, actress & model
22 May - Tiago Leifert, journalist & TV host
13 June - Lígia Mendes, TV host & actress
20 July - Dado Dolabella, actor & singer
20 September - Guilherme Berenguer, actor

Deaths

See also
1980 in Brazil
List of Brazilian films of 1980